Sidi Kacem (Berber: ⵙⵉⴷⵉ ⵇⴰⵙⴰⵎ) is a city in Rabat-Salé-Kénitra, Morocco. It is the capital of Sidi Kacem Province.

History

During the French period the city was called Petitjean, in reference to a French captain who was killed in May 1911 during the "pacification" of Morocco. Oil drilling exploration commenced in the vicinity of Sidi Kacem by the French in 1934; production of crude oil began locally in 1939.

Slightly to the south of Sidi Kacem lies Volubilis, which was in antiquity an important Roman town near the westernmost border of the Roman Empire. It was built on the site of a previous Mauretanian settlement from the third century BC, if not earlier.

Weather
Winters in the other hand are comparatively chilly, especially at night, and lows usually go beyond the freezing point. It does not snow in Sidi Kacem.

Education
There are no universities in Sidi Kacem, and the only higher education available is in the Prince Moulay Abdellah Technical High School, where students can get a Higher Diploma in Electrical studies. Most residents of the city who seek higher education travel to Kenitra, where they can attend Ibn Tofail University, or other larger cities.

Transportation
Sidi Kacem's small taxis have fixed tolls depending on from where you are going and your destination. Add 50% of the toll at night.

Sidi Kacem is located along Morocco's national ONCF railway line and was considered a crossroads because passengers going to the North had to switch trains in its station. This is not longer the case as the ONCF has constructed a direct railway which doesn't cross Sidi Kacem.

The town has a local bus station, which serves all the regions of the country, in addition to multiple grand-taxis stations, for the nearest cities and villages.

Points of interest
 Sidi Kacem's tomb located in Zaouia.
 Oil refinery.

Notable people
Ezzaki Badou - Former international goalkeeper and current manager
Salaheddine Sbaï - Former international footballer
Rachid Taoussi - Former footballer and current manager

References

Municipalities of Morocco
Populated places in Sidi Kacem Province
Sidi Kacem